Kaua is a locality and the municipal seat of the eponymous Kaua Municipality in the state of Yucatán in southeastern Mexico.

Toponymy
The name (Kaua) is a word from the Yucatec Maya language meaning the place that is bitter.

References

Populated places in Yucatán
Municipality seats in Yucatán